This list of tallest buildings and structures in Nottingham ranks the tallest buildings as well as structures within the City of Nottingham by height.

St. Peter's Church in Nottingham was 1480, and was the tallest building in Nottingham for 361 years. High rise development in Nottingham was most active during the 1960s when many residential flats and tower blocks were constructed. However several towerblocks have been demolished or renovated during the 1980s and 2010s. High rise development slowed during the 1970s, and since 2000 only a few high rise buildings have been constructed.

Tallest existing buildings and structures
The tallest existing buildings and structures above , as of March 2022, in Nottingham are listed below.

Tallest under construction, approved and proposed
Below are sub-sections for the tallest under construction, approved and proposed buildings and structures in Nottingham.

Under construction

Approved

Proposed

Tallest unbuilt and demolished
Below are sub-sections for the tallest unbuilt and demolished buildings and structures in Nottingham.

Tallest unbuilt buildings and structures
This lists proposals for the construction of buildings in Nottingham that were planned to rise at least , for which planning permission was rejected or which were otherwise withdrawn.

Tallest demolished buildings and structures
This list shows the tallest buildings in structures in Nottingham of at least  in height that have been demolished.

Timeline of tallest buildings and structures

Tallest structures in Nottinghamshire

References

Buildings and structures in Nottingham
Nottingham